Metanippononychus is a genus of harvestman in the family Paranonychidae. There are at least four described species in Metanippononychus.

Species
These four species belong to the genus Metanippononychus:
 Metanippononychus daisenensis Suzuki, 1975
 Metanippononychus iriei Suzuki, 1975
 Metanippononychus iyanus Suzuki, 1975
 Metanippononychus tomishimai Suzuki, 1975

References

Further reading

 
 
 

Harvestmen